Heinrich Hohl (January 19, 1900 – December 29, 1968) was a German politician of the Christian Democratic Union (CDU) and former member of the German Bundestag.

Life 
Hohl joined the CDU in 1946 and since then has served as mayor of the community of Erksdorf. He was a member of the German Bundestag from November 3, 1949, when he succeeded Werner Hilpert as deputy, until the end of the first legislative period in 1953. He had entered parliament via the Landesliste Hessen.

Literature

References

1900 births
1968 deaths
Members of the Bundestag for Hesse
Members of the Bundestag 1949–1953
Members of the Bundestag for the Christian Democratic Union of Germany